The Tower of Power! is an album by saxophonist Dexter Gordon which was recorded in 1969 and released on the Prestige label.

Reception

Lindsay Planer of AllMusic states, "Dexter Gordon (tenor sax) returned to the United States in the spring of 1969 to create his first studio recordings in nearly a decade... Gordon selflessly provides copious space to his bandmates, a quality that certainly makes selections such as these a pleasure to revisit".

Track listing 
All compositions by Dexter Gordon except as indicated
 "Montmartre" (Dexter Gordon, Rex Stewart) – 10:54     
 "The Rainbow People" – 8:49     
 "Stanley the Steamer" – 8:02     
 "Those Were the Days" (Gene Raskin) – 8:02

Personnel 
Dexter Gordon – tenor saxophone
James Moody – tenor saxophone (track 1)
Barry Harris – piano
Buster Williams – bass
Albert "Tootie" Heath – drums

References 

Dexter Gordon albums
1969 albums
Prestige Records albums
Albums produced by Don Schlitten